Amerigeddon is a 2016 American action film directed by Mike Norris and written by Gary Heavin and Chase Hunter. The film describes a fictional attack on the United States by its own government, working in concert with a global Elitist organization and the United Nations. Heavin has said that he regards the events in the film as a "very real threat".

The film was shot on Heavin's Central Texas ranch and in nearby towns, and most cast members were recruited locally.

The film was released on May 13, 2016.

Premise
In the near future, a terrorist organization backed both by the United Nations and a shadowy European billionaire globalist , who is actually an alien, permanently disables the United States of America's power grid with an electromagnetic pulse attack. The current president, who is actually a puppet of the United Nations, declares permanent martial law and the UN Task Force, consisting of mostly soldiers of Chinese and Russian nationality, occupy the country in order to prepare it for enslavement by an unseen alien intelligence. A detachment of US soldiers is ordered to help the UN forces stage false-flag attacks and make the American public more open to the UN occupation, but one of them refuses and defects from the US forces and regroups with his patriotic family. The family and their allies fight to save their little part of the United States and send a message to the UN that America will not be controlled by globalists and aliens. The patriots successfully resist the initial UN assault after an intense battle, but the main characters indicate that the war is just beginning.

Cast
 Spencer Neville as Brandon Lane
 Gary Heavin as Charlie
 Marshall R. Teague as Col. Crane
 Dina Meyer as Kelly
 Carey Scott as Roger Smith
 India Eisley as Penny 
 AnnaLynne McCord as Sam
 Greta Norris as Frankie
 Mike Norris as Harlan
 Diane Ladd as Betty
 Jonny Cruz as Timmes
 Chuck Huber as Colonel Kashoid
 Giovannie Cruz as Sandra
 Alex Jones as Senator Reed

References

External links
 

American action films
2016 action films
2016 films
Films about the United Nations
Films set in Dubai
Films set in Texas
Films shot in Texas
2010s English-language films
2010s American films